The 1932 North Dakota gubernatorial election was held on November 8, 1932. Republican nominee William Langer defeated Democratic nominee Herbert C. DePuy with 54.75% of the vote.

Primary elections
Primary elections were held on June 29, 1932.

Democratic primary

Candidates
Herbert C. DePuy, former Walsh County State's Attorney 
Tobias D. Casey, former State Representative

Results

Republican primary

Candidates
William Langer, former North Dakota Attorney General
Frank H. Hyland, former Lieutenant Governor
W. E. Black

Results

General election

Candidates
Major party candidates
William Langer, Republican
Herbert C. DePuy, Democratic

Other candidates
Andrew Omholt, Communist

Results

References

1932
North Dakota
Gubernatorial